Karacaoğlan is a village in Mut district of Mersin Province, Turkey. The population of the village was 354  as of 2012. The population of the village is composed of Turkmens. The former name of the village was Çukur. But after the tomb of the famous Turkish folk poet Karacaoğlan (1606-1680)  was discovered in the village graveyard, it was renamed after Karacaoğlan. Main economic activity of Karacaoğlan is agriculture..

References

Villages in Mut District